Trishogi is a shogi variant for two players created by George R. Dekle Sr. in 1987. The gameboard comprises 9×10 interlocking triangular cells. The game is in all respects the same as shogi, except that piece moves have been transfigured for the triangular board-cell geometry.

Trishogi was included in World Game Review No. 10 edited by Michael Keller.

Game rules 
Trishogi has the same types and numbers of pieces as shogi, and all normal shogi rules apply, including initial setup (see diagram), drops, promotion, check, and checkmate. As in shogi, pieces capture the same as they move. But the triangular geometry creates special move patterns for the pieces.

Piece moves 
The diagrams show how the unpromoted pieces move. As in shogi, a dragon king (promoted rook) moves as a rook and as a king. A dragon horse (promoted bishop) moves as a bishop and king.

See also 
 Shogi variants
 Also by George Dekle:
 Hexshogi – a variant with hexagonal cells
 Masonic Shogi
 Space Shogi – a 3D variant
 Triangular Chess – a chess variant with triangular cells

References 

Bibliography
 
 

Board games introduced in 1987
Abstract strategy games
Shogi variants